James Spencer is a Canadian curler.

Awards
Manitoba Curling Hall of Fame: 2008 (with all 1981 Canadian Men's Championship Team skipped by Kerry Burtnyk)

Teams

Personal life
Spencer is married to fellow curler Barb Spencer and has coached her team.

References

External links
 
 Jim Spencer – Curling Canada Stats Archive

Living people
Brier champions
Canadian curling coaches
Canadian male curlers
Curlers from Winnipeg
Year of birth missing (living people)